Zhang Boli (born 1959) is a Chinese dissident.

Biography
Zhang Boli was born in Wangkui County, Heilongjiang Province. He worked as a journalist after graduating from a three-year college in Heilongjiang Province. He attended a short training program for writers at Beijing University in 1989.

Zhang participated and became one of the leaders in the late stage of the Tiananmen Square Protests of 1989 and helped organize the hunger strike that accompanied it. He was number 17 on the Chinese Most Wanted list for the 21 leaders of Tiananmen Square Protest.

After escaping from Beijing, Zhang spent two years as a fugitive in China. He once escaped into the Soviet Union, but his request to be sent to a free country as a political refugee seeking asylum was refused. He was allowed to escape back into China. He worked at a small farm in a remote corner of Heilongjiang Province. After a friend found a way for him to escape, he came down south again and was smuggled into Hong Kong. During Zhang's hiding, his first wife declared divorce with him on newspaper and abandoned their daughter. He managed to visited his daughter briefly before leaving China.

Zhang authored book Escape From China detailing his ordeal escaping from the PRC government. He is currently a pastor in the Washington, D.C. area and leads a church called "Harvest Chinese Christian Church" in Fairfax, Virginia. He married his second wife and has two children from two marriages.

See also
 Wuer Kaixi
 Wang Dan (dissident)

Sources

External links
 Zhang Boli's web site

1959 births
Chinese Christians
Chinese dissidents
Living people
People from Suihua
1989 Tiananmen Square protesters